Chieli Minucci (born April 17, 1958) is an American guitarist who co-founded the band Special EFX.

Career
His father, Ulpio Minucci, was a concert pianist and composer who wrote the music to the 1955 song "Domani."

Chieli Minucci started Special EFX in 1982 with George Jinda, a drummer from Hungary. The band combined rock, Latin rhythm, and smooth jazz. When the duo separated in 1995, Jinda continued to perform under the name Special EFX. After Jinda's death in 2001, Minucci performed under the name Chieli Minucci and Special EFX. He recorded albums as a solo act, beginning in 1994 with Jewels. He has worked as a record producer and composer for Deborah Henson-Conant and Kim Pensyl and as a sideman for Angela Bofill, Roberta Flack, Chaka Khan, and Noel Pointer.

Awards and honors
 Outstanding Achievement in Music Direction and Composition for a Drama Series, Daytime Emmy Awards, The Guiding Light, 1999, 2007, 2008
 "Deep as the Night" was the #1 Smooth Jazz Song of the Year 2018

Discography

As leader
 Jewels (JVC, 1995)
 Renaissance (JVC, 1996)
 It's Gonna Be Good (JVC, 1998)
 Sweet on You (Shanachie, 2000)
 Night Grooves (Shanachie, 2003)
 Got It Goin' On (Shanachie, 2005)
 Solos, Duos, & Trios (ChieliMusic, 2008)
 Pop Today (ChieliMusic, 2008)
 Raspberry & Cream (ChieliMusic, 2008)
 Drippings (ChieliMusic, 2008)
 Travels (Watchfire Music, 2009)
 East of the Sun (Watchfire Music, 2009)

With Special EFX
 Special EFX (GRP, 1983)
 Modern Manners (GRP, 1985)
 Slice of Life (GRP, 1986)
 Mystique (GRP, 1987)
 Double Feature (GRP, 1988)
 Confidential (GRP, 1989)
 Just Like Magic (GRP, 1990)
 Peace of the World (GRP, 1991)
 Global Village (GRP, 1992)
 Play (JVC, 1993)
 Catwalk (JVC, 1994)
 Body Language (JVC, 1995)
 Masterpiece (Shanachie, 1999)
 Butterfly (Shanachie, 2001)
 Party (Shanachie, 2003)
 A Night with Chieli Minucci & Special EFX (Shanachie, 2006)
 Sweet Surrender (Shanachie, 2007)
 Without You (ChieliMusic, 2010)
 Deep as the Night (Trippin 'n' Rhythm, 2017)
 All Stars (Trippin 'n' Rhythm, 2020)

As sideman
With Anastacia
 Not That Kind (Epic/Daylight, 2000)
 Freak of Nature (Epic/Daylight, 2001)
 You'll Never Be Alone (Epic/Daylight, 2002)
 Pieces of a Dream (Epic/Daylight, 2005)

With Celine Dion
 Let's Talk About Love (Columbia, 1997)
 These Are Special Times (Columbia, 1998)
 I'm Alive (Columbia, 2002)
 A New Day Has Come (Columbia, 2002)
 One Heart (Columbia, 2003)

With Deborah Henson-Conant
 Caught in the Act (GRP, 1990)
 Talking Hands (GRP, 1991)
 Budapest (MCD Jazz, 1992)

With Chris Hinze
 Saliah (Keytone, 1984)
 African Dream (Keytone, 1991)
 Music for Relaxation (Keytone, 1992)

With others
 Marc Anthony, Mended (Columbia, 2002)
 Angela Bofill, Love in Slow Motion (Shanachie, 1996)
 Backstreet Boys, Millennium (GSM Music, 1999)
 B. B. & Q. Band, All Night Long (Capitol, 1982)
 B. B. & Q. Band, Six Million Times (Capitol, 1983)
 Bob Baldwin, Standing Tall (Narada, 2002)
 Jay Beckenstein, Eye Contact (Windham Hill, 2000)
 Tom Browne, R'N'Browne (Hip Bop, 1999)
 Will Downing, Invitation Only (Mercury, 1997)
 Roberta Flack, Oasis (Atlantic, 1988)
 Russell Gunn, Ethnomusicology Vol. 1 (Atlantic, 1999)
 Omar Hakim, We Are One (OzMosis, 2014)
 Lionel Hampton, For the Love of Music (MoJazz, 1995)
 Enrique Iglesias, Escape (Interscope, 2002)
 Jewel, Joy (Atlantic, 1999)
 Jennifer Lopez, On the 6 (Work, 1999)
 Cheryl Lynn, It's Gonna Be Right (Columbia, 1985)
 Marion Meadows, Player's Club (Heads Up, 2004)
 Kim Pensyl, Eyes of Wonder (GRP, 1993)
 Noel Pointer, Never Lose Your Heart (Shanachie, 1993)
 Nicole Renee, Nicole Renee (Atlantic, 1998)
 Rick Rhodes, Now You See It (Beverly, 1994)
 Rick Rhodes, Indian Summer (Beverly, 1995)
 Lionel Richie, To Love a Woman (Island, 2003)
 Jessica Simpson, Irresistible (Columbia, 2001)
 Kevin Toney, Strut (Shanachie, 2001)
 Nestor Torres, Mi Alma Latina (Shanachie, 2002)
 Gerald Veasley, Signs (101 South, 1994)
 Gerald Veasley, Love Letters (Inak, 1999)
 Roseanna Vitro, Catchin' Some Rays (Telarc, 1997)

Music library production

References

External links
 Official site 
 Interview
 

American jazz guitarists
American people of Italian descent
Smooth jazz guitarists
1958 births
Living people
GRP Records artists
Daytime Emmy Award winners
American jazz musicians
American male guitarists
20th-century American guitarists
20th-century American male musicians
American male jazz musicians